Brachyplatystoma filamentosum, the piraíba or kumakuma, is a species of large catfish of the family Pimelodidae and genus Brachyplatystoma that is native to Amazon and Orinoco River basins and rivers in Guianas and northeastern Brazil.

Distribution
It is a widespread species that is found in rivers and estuaries of Amazon and Orinoco watersheds, Guianas and northeastern Brazil.

Description
It grows to a length of 2.8 m. The largest Amazon Piraíba records 2 – 2.5 m weighing more than 150 kg.

Dorsum dark to light grey with small dark spots on caudal-fin or peduncle. Dorsal fin with pink shading. Caudal fin deeply-forked. Juveniles exhibit dark body spots or blotches.

It is entirely piscivorous preying on loricariids and other bottom-dwelling fish.

Ecology
Brachyplatystoma filamentosum is found in both freshwater and brackish water systems. The species is a demersal potamodromous fish that commonly inhabits deeper, flowing channels with soft bottoms.

Uses
Though a massive species, Piraíba is considered as a game fish and commercial fish. Generally harmless, it is known to be an obligate piscivore; however, stomach contents are said to include parts of monkeys.

References

Pimelodidae
Catfish of South America
Freshwater fish of Brazil
Taxa named by Hinrich Lichtenstein
Fish described in 1819